Thomas Ebert (born 23 July 1973 in Roskilde, Sjælland) is a Danish lightweight rower who won gold at the 2004 and 2008 Summer Olympics in the Men's Lightweight Coxless Fours with the Gold Four.

He lives near Roskilde and is still active into sport, although not on elite-level. Mostly, this regards running, sailing, and some rowing on national level.

References

 

Living people
Danish male rowers
Olympic rowers of Denmark
Rowers at the 2000 Summer Olympics
Rowers at the 2004 Summer Olympics
Rowers at the 2008 Summer Olympics
Olympic bronze medalists for Denmark
Olympic gold medalists for Denmark
People from Roskilde
1973 births
Olympic medalists in rowing
Medalists at the 2008 Summer Olympics
Medalists at the 2004 Summer Olympics
Medalists at the 2000 Summer Olympics
World Rowing Championships medalists for Denmark
Sportspeople from Region Zealand